FFO may refer to:
 Firefly Online, a video game
 Frankfurt (Oder), Germany
 Frankfurt East station, in Germany
 Funds from operations, a measure of revenue for investment trusts
 Furnace fuel oil
 Norwegian Federation of Organisations of Disabled People
 Wright-Patterson Air Force Base, in Ohio, United States